The UK Albums Chart is one of many music charts compiled by the Official Charts Company that calculates the best-selling albums of the week in the United Kingdom. Before 2004, the chart was only based on the sales of physical albums. This list shows albums that peaked in the Top 10 of the UK Albums Chart during 1995, as well as albums which peaked in 1994 and 1996 but were in the top 10 in 1995. The entry date is when the album appeared in the top ten for the first time (week ending, as published by the Official Charts Company, which is six days after the chart is announced).

The first new number-one album of the year was The Colour of My Love by Celine Dion. Overall, twenty-seven different albums peaked at number-one in 1995, with twenty-seven unique artists hitting that position.

Background

Best-selling albums
Robson & Jerome had the best-selling album of the year with Robson & Jerome. (What's the Story) Morning Glory? by Oasis came in second place. The Colour of My Love by Celine Dion, Life by Simply Red and HIStory: Past, Present and Future, Book I by Michael Jackson made up the top five. Albums by Queen, Paul Weller, Wet Wet Wet, Blur and Pulp were also in the top-ten best selling albums of the year.

Top-ten albums
Key

See also
1995 in British music
List of number-one albums from the 1990s (UK)

References
General

Specific

External links
1995 album chart archive at the Official Charts Company (click on relevant week)

United Kingdom top 10 albums
Top 10 albums
1995